Gilliam is an unincorporated community on the North Fork River in McDowell County, West Virginia, United States. It lies between Algoma and Rolfe along County Route 17.

The community was named after one Mr. Gilliam, a coal-mining official.

References 

Unincorporated communities in McDowell County, West Virginia
Unincorporated communities in West Virginia